José Ignacio Garmendia Mendizábal (born 4 April 1960) is a Spanish retired footballer who played as a goalkeeper.

Club career
Garmendia was born in Villabona, Gipuzkoa. He played solely for Basque club SD Eibar, in a career that lasted 19 years. He stayed with the team as they competed consecutively in the nation's fourth, third and second divisions, making 322 appearances in the latter.

On 17 April 1988, in a third-tier match against Pontevedra CF, Garmendia scored from his goal, and Eibar would also promote at the end of the campaign. He retired ten years later at the age of 38, only having been second choice precisely in his last season (three games played) and with the side always retaining their league status; he collected two Ricardo Zamora Trophy awards in the process.

Personal life
Still during his career, and after retiring, Garmendia ran a butcher shop in his hometown.

See also
List of one-club men

References

External links

1960 births
Living people
People from Tolosaldea
Sportspeople from Gipuzkoa
Spanish footballers
Footballers from the Basque Country (autonomous community)
Association football goalkeepers
Segunda División players
Segunda División B players
Tercera División players
CD Hernani players
SD Eibar footballers